Monster is a 2016 South Korean television series starring Kang Ji-hwan, Sung Yu-ri, Park Ki-woong and Claudia Kim. It replaced Glamorous Temptation and airs on MBC on Mondays and Tuesdays at 09:55pm (KST) from March 28 to September 20, 2016 for 50 episodes.

Plot
In his youth, Lee Guk-cheol lost his wealthy family and his inheritance to his greedy uncle, Byun Il-jae. He lost everything and descended to the lowest echelons of society, from spoiled rich heir to lowly beggar almost overnight. However, an opportunity arises whereby he is able to obtain a new identity - Kang Gi-tan, allowing him to take back what is rightfully his and enact vengeance on those responsible for ruining his life. However, in his quest for revenge, he meets opposition in the form of Do Gun-woo, the illegitimate son of a chaebol chairman, and Oh Soo-yeon, a young woman who seem suspiciously similar to someone he developed feelings for in his youth.

Cast

Main cast
Kang Ji-hwan as Kang Ki-tan / Lee Guk-cheol
Lee Gi-kwang as young Lee Guk-cheol
Born Lee Guk-cheol, he was the heir to Sudo Hospital, until the deaths of his parents and aunt. He survived several murder attempts against him, but lost everything and became a beggar. Blinded by the car accident that killed his parents, Guk-cheol's sense of hearing is heightened to superhuman levels, an ability he would continue to possess as an adult. Years later, he undergoes surgery to cure his blindness and change his appearance. He obtains a new identity - Kang Ki-tan, using it to exact revenge on those responsible for his predicament. Later in the series, he is adopted by Jo Ki-ryang, the leader of Huaping after he takes a bullet for him. With the latter's financial backing, Ki-tan starts his own company, KT Corporation, with plans to take over Dodo Group and complete his revenge.
Sung Yu-ri as Oh Soo-yeon / Cha Jeong-eun
Lee Yul-eum as young Cha Jeong-eun
As a teenager, Cha Jeong-eun met Guk-cheol when she worked as his maid. Guk-cheol begin to develop feelings for her but circumstances separated the two. Many years later, she now goes by the name Oh Soo-yeon. She meets Kang Ki-tan, but both are unaware of their shared past together due to both of them having adopted new identities. She is somewhat materialistic, stemming from her struggles to make ends meet to pay for her autistic younger brother's medical fees. Later in the series, she starts up a law firm with Min Byung-ho.
Park Ki-woong as Do Gun-woo
He is the illegitimate son of Dodo Group's chairman. Gun-woo lived in America for most of his youth, having murdered his abusive stepfather and witnessed his mother commit suicide. Byun Il-jae brings him back to Korea with the intention of using him as a tool to topple Dodo Group's chairman and take the company for himself. As one of Dodo Group's new recruits, Gun-woo develops a mutual rivalry with Kang Ki-tan. After Do Choong finds out that Gun-woo is his illegitimate son, he takes Gun-woo under his wing and promotes him to Vice Chairman of Dodo Group.
Claudia Kim as Yoo Seong-ae
A NIS agent who has been tasked with infiltrating Dodo Group.

Dodo Group
Dodo Group is a large and powerful chaebol in Korea. The chairman is Do Choong. The main cast have found employment within Dodo Group, each with their own motivations and objectives.
Park Yeong-gyu as Do Choong
The chairman of Dodo Group. He is the father of Gwang-woo and Shin-young. He also has an illegitimate son - Gun-woo.
Jeong Bo-seok as Byun Il-jae
The main antagonist of the series. Il-jae was Guk-cheol's uncle who murdered his parents and stole his inheritance. He was once a prosecutor but now works on the legal team of Dodo Group. He is a greedy and power-hungry man who schemes to take control of Dodo Group and eventually rise to a position of eminence. 
Park Hoon as Oh Choong-dong
Byun Il-jae's unquestionably loyal manservant, who usually helps to carry out Il-jae's dirty work.
Lee Deok-hwa as Hwang Jae-man
A politician. He is Do Choong's brother-in-law and Il-jae's father-in-law. He harbors resentment towards Do Choong.
Kim Bo-yeon as Hwang Gwi-ja
Do Choong's wife and Jae-man's sister. She has a strong animosity towards Gun-woo, being responsible for banishing his mother, who was Do Choong's mistress. Gwi-ja becomes increasingly angry when Do Choong allows Gun-woo's rise to power in Dodo Group after Gwang-woo's imprisonment. 
Jin Tae-hyun as Do Gwang-woo
The CEO of Dodo Group and Do Choong's eldest son. Gwang-woo is an extremely greedy and unscrupulous man, having blackmailed Il-jae into murdering Guk-cheol's parents. Gwang-woo was later found guilty of creating a slush fund and for allowing T9, a carcinogenic coating agent in Dodo Group's products. He is sent to prison, although he is later pardoned and released.
Jo Bo-ah as Do Shin-young
Do Choong's youngest daughter. She is a typical bratty and spoiled rich girl. She has a habit of calling Ki-tan 'Kang Ga-din', whom she develops a crush on.
Kim Hye-eun as Hwang Ji-soo
Jae-man's daughter. Like her father, she also entered politics. Il-jae had an affair with her. She accidentally killed Man-ok, Il-jae's first wife and her friend when the affair was discovered. Il-jae helped her cover up the crime and made her his second wife.
Jung Woong-in as Moon Tae-gwang
The chief secretary of the SPD division in Dodo Group. He dislikes Byun Il-jae, and the feeling is mutual. A hardworking employee who dedicated his life to Dodo Group, he is fired by Gwang-woo for hurting the latter's pride. After struggling with poverty for a year, Ki-tan recruits him to join his company, KT Corporation, which Tae-gwang accepts. He becomes Ki-tan's right-hand man, swearing complete allegiance to Ki-tan in return for helping him clear his debts.
Kim Se-ah as Mo Kyung-shin
Tae-gwang's assistant.
Cha Kwang-soo as Go Hae-sool
Dodo Group executive.
Lee Seung-hyung as Han Sang-goo
The Do family's secretary.
Song Kyung-chul as Gong Bok-shin
The Do family's butler who is very loyal to Do Choong. He was once the head of the SPD at Dodo Group and Moon Tae-gwang's superior.
Kim Dong-hee as Lee Soo-tak
A nerdy Dodo Group employee who entered the company at the same time as the main characters. He has a crush on Yoo Seong-ae. He loses his job and goes to prison due to the machinations of Byun Il-jae and Do Gun-woo. A year later, Ki-tan recruits him and Moon Tae-gwang to join his company, KT Corporation.
Lee Mun-jeong as Hong Nan-jeong
One of the new Dodo Group employees who entered the company at the same time as the main characters. She is close friends with Soo-yeon. She later quits Dodo Group to work at the law firm founded by Oh Soo-yeon and Min Byung-ho.
Jin Ye-sol as Park So-hee
One of the new Dodo Group employees who entered the company at the same time as the main characters. She looks down and dislikes Soo-yeon.
Shin Joo-hwan as Kim Hae-il
One of the new Dodo Group employees who entered the company at the same time as the main characters. He later becomes Gun-woo's personal assistant when the latter is promoted to Vice Chairman of Dodo Group.

Huaping
An underground firearms dealer associated with the Chinese mafia.

Choi Jong-won as Jo Ki-ryang
The boss of Huaping, whose identity was a mystery at the start of the series. He adopts Ki-tan after the latter saves him during an assassination attempt.
Lee El as Ok Chae-ryung
She is a Chinese expat who was once Man-ok's secretary. It is later revealed that she is actually a lobbyist working for a secret organization which plans to obtain the vaccine for MK2, a lethal mutant virus. However, Jeong-eun injects the vaccine into Guk-Cheol. Chae-ryung now fronts as the owner of an art gallery. She offered to purchase Guk-cheol's blood for the vaccine; in exchange her organization would provide financial backing to Guk-cheol to adopt his Kang Ki-tan persona and exact revenge. Chae-ryung has an unrequited love for Ki-tan, and thus tries to keep him and Soo-yeon apart.
Go Yoon as Cha Woo
Another Chinese expat who works together with Chae-ryung for the same secret organization.

Others
Kim Won-hae as Min Byung-ho
A lawyer who is the closest thing to family that Soo-yeon has. He helps look out for her brother too, and also provides help to Ki-tan from time to time. He later starts a law firm with Soo-yeon.
Jung Soon-won as Oh Jin-cheol / Cha Dong-soo
Jung Soo-hwan as young Cha Dong-soo
Jeong-eun's younger brother, who suffers from Lennox–Gastaut syndrome, thus requiring her to work hard to pay his medical fees. Later, his name was changed to Oh Jin-cheol, alongside his sister who adopted the name Oh Soo-yeon. Dong-soo is shown to have a photographic memory. He is murdered by Byun Il-jae in episode 24.
Kim Myung-soo as Cha Joong-rak 
Jeong-eun and Dong-soo's father, who worked as the head of security at Sudo Hospital when Guk-cheol was a teenager. He dies after being exposed to the MK2 virus.
Nam Myung-ryul as Lee Joon-sik
Lee Guk-cheol's father.
Nam Gi-ae as Jung Mi-ok 
Lee Guk-cheol's mother.
Lee Ah-hyun as Choi Ji-hye
A woman campaigning against the use of T9, a cancer-causing agent in Dodo Group's products.
Shin Seung-hwan as Yang Dong-yi
A gangster boss who manages Do Gwang-woo's slush fund.
Go In-bum as Kim Dae-woo
A corrupt former army general working with Hwang Jae-man.
Kim Young-woong as Yeom Hyeong-gu
Yoo Seong-ae's direct supervisor in the NIS, whom she reports her infiltration activities in Dodo Group to. He is later revealed to be working for Hwang Jae-man.
Lee Ga-ryeong as Hong Ee-jin

Cameo 
Bae Jong-ok as Jung Man-ok
Byun Il-jae's first wife and Guk-cheol's aunt. She is accidentally killed by Hwang Ji-soo. 
Sung Ji-ru as Go Joo-tae
A criminal hired by Byun Il-jae to kill Guk-cheol.
Chen Bolin as Michael Chang
A wealthy Chinese businessman who was involved in the manufacture and distribution of counterfeit drugs, which affected Dodo Group.
Lee Won-jong as Na Do-kwang
A scientist working on the vaccine for the MK2 virus. He is murdered by Oh Choong-dong and Ki-tan is framed for the crime.

Ratings 
In the table below,  represent the lowest ratings and  represent the highest ratings.
NR denotes that the drama did not rank in the top 20 daily programs on that date.

Remark
Episode 39 wasn't aired on Monday August 8 due to broadcast of the 2016 Summer Olympics in Rio de Janeiro, Brazil. This episode was aired on Tuesday August 9, 2016.
Episode 40 wasn't aired on August 15 and August 16 due to broadcast of the 2016 Summer Olympics in Rio de Janeiro, Brazil. This episode was aired on Monday August 22, 2016.

Original soundtrack

OST Part 1

OST Part 2

OST Part 3

International broadcast
In Indonesia, the drama airs on Oh!K with subtitles the same day as the South Korean broadcast.
In Singapore, the drama airs on Oh!K with subtitles the same day as the South Korean broadcast. It is also available to stream with subtitles 12 hours after its original broadcast on Viu.
 Vietnam: HTV2

Accolades

References

External links
 Monster at Victory Contents 

2016 South Korean television series debuts
2016 South Korean television series endings
Korean-language television shows
MBC TV television dramas
Television shows written by Jang Young-chul
South Korean melodrama television series
South Korean romance television series
National Intelligence Service (South Korea) in fiction
Television series by Victory Contents